Yvette Michel (born 1965) is a Canadian retired Paralympic swimmer. She competed at the 1980 and 1984 Paralympics. Michel is blind, having lost her sight at the age of three, and first competed when she was 14 years old.

References

Living people
1965 births
Canadian female backstroke swimmers
Canadian female freestyle swimmers
Canadian female breaststroke swimmers
Canadian female butterfly swimmers
Canadian female medley swimmers
Paralympic swimmers of Canada
Medalists at the 1980 Summer Paralympics
Medalists at the 1984 Summer Paralympics
Swimmers from Vancouver
Paralympic gold medalists for Canada
Paralympic silver medalists for Canada
Paralympic medalists in swimming
Swimmers at the 1980 Summer Paralympics
Swimmers at the 1984 Summer Paralympics
20th-century Canadian women
21st-century Canadian women